A referendum on Sunday shopping was held in Slovenia on 21 September 2003. Voters were asked whether they approved of limiting shops to opening on ten Sundays a year. The proposal was approved by 58% of voters, although voter turnout was only 27.5%.

Results

References

2003 referendums
Referendums in Slovenia
2003 in Slovenia
September 2003 events in Europe